Results from Norwegian football (soccer) in the year 1916.

Prøveligaen 1914–1916 (Unofficial)

Note: Results of Kvik - Larvik Turn, Larvik Turn - Mercantile and Mercantile - Kvik are unknown.

Class A of local association leagues
Class A of local association leagues (kretsserier) is the predecessor of a national league competition. The champions qualify for the 1916 Norwegian Cup.

Smaalenene

Kristiania og omegn

Group 1

Group 2

Championship final

|colspan="3" style="background-color:#97DEFF"|

Romerike

Oplandene

Vestfold

Grenland

Group 1

Position play-offs

|colspan="3" style="background-color:#97DEFF"|

Group 2

Championship final
Fram (Larvik) won championship final against Larvik Turn on walkover.

Telemark

Sørlandske
Start champion.

Table unknown

Vesterlen

Bergen og omegn

Romsdalske

Trondhjem

Inn-Trøndelagen

Norwegian Cup

First round

|colspan="3" style="background-color:#97DEFF"|9 September 1916

|-
|colspan="3" style="background-color:#97DEFF"|13 September 1916

Kvik (Fredrikshald) had a walkover.

Second round

|colspan="3" style="background-color:#97DEFF"|17 September 1916

Lyn (Gjøvik) had a walkover.

Rematch

|colspan="3" style="background-color:#97DEFF"|29 September 1916

Semi-finals

|colspan="3" style="background-color:#97DEFF"|3 October 1915

Final

National team

Sources:

References

External links
 RSSSF Norway

 
Seasons in Norwegian football